"Oklahoma Borderline" is a song co-written and recorded by American country music artist Vince Gill.  It was released in November 1985 as the third single from the album The Things That Matter.  The song reached #9 on the Billboard Hot Country Singles & Tracks chart.  It was written by Gill, Rodney Crowell and Guy Clark.

Chart performance

References

1986 singles
1985 songs
Vince Gill songs
Songs written by Vince Gill
Songs written by Guy Clark
Songs written by Rodney Crowell
Song recordings produced by Emory Gordy Jr.
RCA Records singles